The following is a list of ecoregions in Portugal, including the Azores and Madeira, according to the Worldwide Fund for Nature (WWF).

Terrestrial ecoregions

Mediterranean forests, woodlands, and scrub
 Iberian sclerophyllous and semi-deciduous forests
 Northwest Iberian montane forests
 Southwest Iberian Mediterranean sclerophyllous and mixed forests

Temperate broadleaf and mixed forests
 Azores temperate mixed forests
 Cantabrian mixed forests
 Madeira evergreen forests

Freshwater ecoregions
 Southern Iberia
 Western Iberia

Marine ecoregions
 Azores Canaries Madeira
 South European Atlantic

References
 Spalding, Mark D., Helen E. Fox, Gerald R. Allen, Nick Davidson et al. "Marine Ecoregions of the World: A Bioregionalization of Coastal and Shelf Areas". Bioscience Vol. 57 No. 7, July/August 2007, pp. 573-583.
 Thieme, Michelle L. (2005). Freshwater Ecoregions of Africa and Madagascar: A Conservation Assessment. Island Press, Washington DC.

 *
Portugal
ecoregions